is a railway station in the city of Myōkō, Niigata, Japan, operated by the third-sector operator Echigo Tokimeki Railway. It is also a freight terminal for the Japan Freight Railway Company.

Lines

Station layout
The station has one side platform and one island platform connected by a footbridge. The station is staffed.

Platforms

Adjacent stations

History

Arai Station opened on 15 August 1886. With the privatization of Japanese National Railways (JNR) on 1 April 1987, the station came under the control of JR East.

From this date, Arai Station was transferred to the ownership of the third-sector operating company Echigo Tokimeki Railway.

Passenger statistics
In fiscal 2017, the station was used by an average of 973 passengers daily (boarding passengers only).

Surrounding area

 Myoko City Office
 Niigata Prefectural Arai High School

See also
 List of railway stations in Japan

References

External links

 Echigo Tokimeki Railway Station information 
 Timetable for Arai Station 

Stations of Echigo Tokimeki Railway
Stations of Japan Freight Railway Company
Railway stations in Niigata Prefecture
Railway stations in Japan opened in 1886
Myōkō, Niigata